Saumya Tandon (born 3 November 1984) is an Indian actress and television presenter, best known for her portrayal of Anita Mishra in the Hindi sitcom television series Bhabiji Ghar Par Hain!. She has been a host on various TV shows like Dance India Dance, Bournvita Quiz Contest and Entertainment Ki Raat.

Early life
Tandon was born in Bhopal, Madhya Pradesh on 3 November 1984. The family shifted to Ujjain where she did her schooling from St. Mary's Convent School. Her father, B.G. Tandon, is a writer and was a professor in a university in Ujjain.

Career
Tandon took up modelling assignments early in her career and was the "Femina Cover Girl First Runner Up" 2006 She also appeared in the Afghan serial Khushi in 2008 as part of the international project, where she played the lead of an Afghan woman doctor. She co-hosted Zor Ka Jhatka: Total Wipeout (based on the Wipeout format) with Shah Rukh Khan in 2011. She has hosted Dance India Dance for 3 seasons, for which she got the Best Anchor award too. She co-hosted Bournvita Quiz Contest, along with Derek O'Brien for three seasons. In Imtiaz Ali's Jab We Met, starring Shahid Kapoor and Kareena Kapoor, she played the role of Kareena's character's sister Roop. She also hosted LG Mallika-e-Kitchen for three seasons.

In 2015, Tandon started playing the role of Anita in the comedy serial Bhabiji Ghar Par Hain!. She is also known as "gori mem" from the serial. In 2018, she hosted Entertainment Ki Raat  Season 2 on Colors TV.

On 21 August 2020, she quit Bhabhi Ji Ghar Par Hain!.

Personal life
Tandon is very reluctant to talk about her private life. In 2016, she married her boyfriend Saurabh Devendra Singh. Before marriage, she dated him for 10 years. 

Tandon gave birth to a boy in 2019.

Filmography

Films

Television 
Tandon started her career with TV serial Aisa Des Hai Mera and subsequently hosted a number of TV shows.

See also
 List of Hindi television actresses  
 List of Indian television actresses
List of Indian film actresses

References

External links

 
 
 

1984 births
Living people
Actresses from Bhopal
Indian film actresses
Indian television actresses
Indian soap opera actresses
Indian women television presenters
Indian game show hosts
Actresses in Hindi cinema
Actresses in Hindi television
Dance India Dance
Indian expatriates in Afghanistan
21st-century Indian actresses